Alfred Brush Ford (born 1950), also known as Ambarish Das, is an American heir to the Ford fortune. He is the great-grandson of Henry Ford, founder of the Ford Motor Company.

Background

Alfred Ford's father was Walter B. Ford II (1920–1991), whose family were prominent in chemical manufacturing in the Downriver area south of Detroit. His mother, Josephine Clay Ford (1923–2005) was the daughter of Edsel Ford (1893–1943), who was the son of Henry Ford (1863–1947). 

Alfred and William Clay Ford Jr. (b. 1957), the current executive chairman of the Ford Motor Co., are first cousins. Alfred's mother was the sister of William Clay Ford Sr. (1925–2014), William Clay Ford, Jr.'s father.

Alfred Ford currently serves on the board of directors of privately held digital marketing firm ChannelNet, where he is also an investor. Ford Motor Company was one of ChannelNet's early clients.

Association with the Hare Krishna Movement

He is an initiated disciple of A.C. Bhaktivedanta Swami Prabhupada (Srila Prabhupada) since 1974. He first met Bhaktivedanta Swami in Dallas, USA. Alfred Ford joined the International Society for Krishna Consciousness (the Hare Krishnas) in 1975 and that same year he made his first trip to India with Prabhupada. He assisted in the establishment of the first Hindu temple in Hawaii and also donated $500,000 to help establish the Bhaktivedanta Cultural Center in Detroit which was completed in 1983. Alfred Ford has made many significant donations to ISKCON over the years which have assisted ongoing projects to build the Pushpa Samadhi Mandir of Prabhupada. He is the chairman of the Sri Mayapur Temple of the Vedic Planetarium (also called TOVP).

Ford is said to have supported the construction of a Vedic cultural centre in Moscow at an estimated cost of $10 million. He also bought a $600,000 mansion to house a Hare Krishna temple and learning centre in Honolulu.

References

External links
Temple of the Vedic Planetarium

Converts to Hinduism from Christianity
1950 births
Henry Ford family
American Hindus
Living people
American Hare Krishnas
Date of birth missing (living people)